Eviny is a Norwegian power company based in Bergen. Eviny is owned by Statkraft (47.9%), Bergen municipality (37.8%) and 16 other municipalities between Sognefjorden and Hardangerfjorden. It performs production and distribution of electricity. Annual production is 7 TWh produced at 29 hydroelectric power plants.

Operations
Eviny is the second largest power grid owner in Norway (after Hafslund) with 450,000 grid customers. The company also offered broadband, cable television and as well as the district heating system in Bergen. The main office is located in Bergen. Eviny also holds partial ownership of the power companies Sogn og Fjordane Energi (38.51%) and Sognekraft (44.44%).

The power stations operated by Eviny include Dale, Evanger, Fana, Fosse, Fossmark, Frøland, Grønsdal, Hellandfoss, Herlandsfoss, Hommelfoss, Kløvtveit, Kollsnes cogenereation plant, Kvittingen, Lundsæter, Matre, Myra, Myster, Møllefossen, Nygård, Oksebotn, Osvatn, Rådal biogas plant, Steinsland, Stend, Takle, Trengereid, Tøsse, Ulvik, Vemundsbotn, Åsebotn.

Electric power companies of Norway
Companies formerly owned by municipalities of Norway
Public utilities established in 1920
1920 establishments in Norway
Companies based in Bergen
Statkraft